Air Putih is a state constituency in Terengganu, Malaysia. It is located in the Kemaman (federal constituency) federal constituency and is currently represented in the Terengganu State Legislative Assembly.

References

Terengganu state constituencies